Rent-a-Goalie is a half-hour comedy television series from Canada that aired on Showcase from 2006 to 2008. The first season was nominated for three Gemini Awards, including Best Comedy Series. It was also nominated for a Directors Guild of Canada Award, the CFTPA Indie Award for Best Comedy Series, an ACTRA Award for Best Male Performance for Christopher Bolton, and four Canadian Comedy Awards, winning two. The second season was nominated for six Gemini Awards, including Best Comedy Series, Best Ensemble Performance, Best Directing, Best Writing, Best Cinematography and Best Casting. It has also been nominated for three Canadian Comedy Awards.

Plot 
Rent-a-Goalie revolves around the exploits of Cake (Christopher Bolton), a hockey-mad, recovered-from-everything go-to guy, who runs a rag-tag hockey goalie rental service out of Cafe Primo, a family-owned coffee shop in Toronto's Little Italy. Here, at this crazy crossroads of hockey culture and coffee culture, Cake has finally found a home.  He spends his time juggling friends and enemies, the ridiculous and the profound, while always trying to live by "The Code" – an ever-evolving set of personal ethics, spiritual maxims and athletic credos that keep him on the straight and narrow.

Cast
Christopher Bolton as Cake
Louis Di Bianco - Johnny
Sarain Boylan - Malta
Stephen Amell as Billy
Inga Cadranel as Francesca
Oliver Becker as O'Malley
Philip Riccio as Puker
Mayko Nguyen as Goth Girl (Stuart)
Jeremy Wright as Short Bus
Carlos Diaz as Looch
Joe Pingue as Joey Almost
Matt Gordon as Doc
Gabriel Hogan as Lance
Pascal Petardi as Shit Pants
Jeff Pustil as Gordie the Reff
Maria Vacratsis as Councillor Melanie  Firstman
Ashley Newbrough as Dallas

Episode List

Season 1 
E01 The Arrivalist
E02 The Irish are Fags
E03 Malta
E04 Blue Balls
E05 Bar Code
E06 Shit Zone
E07 Going to the Chapel
E08 Fire in the Hole

Season 2 
E01 The Voucher
E02 A Gazebo of One's Own
E03 Domi Daze
E04 Burlington
E05 Everybody's a Fag
E06 Nickname Lockout
E07 Rabies Almost
E08 Gnarsty Snarch
E09 B-Boys
E10 Texas

Season 3 
E01 Upstairs
E02 Ham in a Pram
E03 Internetstopper
E04 Eva Has a Dot Dot Dot
E05 Two Letters
E06 He-Man
E07 The Cheesemaker's Oath
E08 Shite Storm

Home media
On March 4, 2008, Alliance Home Entertainment released the complete first season on DVD in Canada.

All 3 seasons are available on iTunes.

Rent a Goalie App
The TV show Rent-a-Goalie provided the idea to make renting a hockey goalie a reality. Several small businesses have opened up to allow recreational hockey teams to easily find and rent hockey goalies for their game. A recent example is Puck App.

References

External links

2000s Canadian sitcoms
2000s Canadian workplace comedy television series
2006 Canadian television series debuts
2008 Canadian television series endings
Showcase (Canadian TV channel) original programming
Television shows set in Toronto
Television series by Entertainment One
Ice hockey television series